Acharius may refer to:

 Acarius, a 6th-century bishop in Gaul
 Erik Acharius, an 18th-century scientist
 The Acharius Medal, named in his honor